Devon Roberts (born 19 February 1984) is a Grenadian international footballer who plays as a defender for Grenadian club Christian Strikers. He earned three caps for the Grenada national football team, all occurring during 2008 Caribbean Cup qualification.

References

Living people
1984 births
Grenadian footballers
Association football defenders
Grenada international footballers